were an all-girl Japanese pop group within Hello! Project. They were formed after they successfully passed the 2nd Morning Musume & Michiyo Heike Imotobun Audition. Melon Kinenbi is the oldest group in the history of Hello! Project not to have changed any of its members since its formation. The band occasionally worked as dancers for other Hello! Project artists; they can, for instance, be seen in the music video for Maki Goto's single "Yaruki! It's Easy".

The entire group officially graduated from the Hello! Project on March 31, 2009, along with the rest of the Elder Club. After their graduation, they collaborated with other Japanese punk-rock groups for several limited-release indie singles, and released their 4th album Melon's Not Dead. Two days after the album release and just after their 10-year anniversary, the group announced that they would disband following their final tour activities in May 2010. The group performed together for the last time on May 3, at Nakano Sun Plaza, although Melon Kinenbi reunited temporarily in April 2011 to help the efforts following the 2011 Tōhoku earthquake and tsunami. On December 31, 2013, Melon Kinenbi reunited a second time to perform at the Hello! Project Countdown Party 2013 〜Good Bye & Hello!〜 event. In October 2018, Melon Kinenbi reunited a third time to perform at the Hello! Project 20th Anniversary!! Hello! Project Hello! Face 2018 event in Saitama.

Members

Discography

Albums

Greatest Hits albums

Singles

Collaboration singles

Unreleased
 (debuted at their 2009 tour)

DVDs

Photobooks 
 2004 – 
 2004 – 
 2004 –

Appearances

Television

Radio 
 Colorful Pleasure
 
 
 Hello Pro Yanen

Internet

Musicals 
 Love Century -Yume wa Minna Kerya Hajimaranai-
 Sōgen no Hito
 Okaeri

Events 
 2005 – July Hello! Project Fan Club Gentei Event

Concerts 
 2002 – 
 2003 – 
 2003 – 
 2003 – 
 2004 – 
 2004 – 
 2004 – 
 2004 – 
 2005 – 
 2005 – 
 2005 – 
 2005 –

References

External links 
 Official UP-FRONT WORKS Discography Entry
 Melon Lounge Official blog

All-female punk bands
Japanese girl groups
Japanese pop music groups
Musical groups established in 2000
Japanese idol groups
Hello! Project groups
2000 establishments in Japan
Musical groups disestablished in 2010
Musical groups from Tokyo
Japanese dance music groups
Japanese electropop groups